Battelle Darby Creek Metro Park is a metropolitan park in Central Ohio, owned and operated by Columbus and Franklin County Metro Parks. The park is within the Pleasant and Prairie townships, southwest of Columbus.

The park encompasses lands and creek beds north & south of the confluence of the Big & Little Darby Creeks. Unique features include restored tallgrass prairie areas totalling  that house a group of 10 American bison, a large nature center with exhibits about the exceptional biodiversity of Big Darby Creek, and a Fort Ancient mound. Thirteen miles of the Big Darby Creek and Little Darby Creek flow through the park. Much of the land for the park was donated by the Battelle Memorial Institute. The northern parcel lies just outside the town of West Jefferson (in Madison County). The park follows the Darby Creeks south past the village of Georgesville and continues towards the crossroads of Darbydale. Detached parcels of the park extend along Darby Creek to the village of Harrisburg (into Pickaway County).

References

External links

 

Parks in Ohio
Protected areas of Fairfield County, Ohio
Protected areas of Franklin County, Ohio